John Keith may refer to:

 John Keith, 1st Earl of Kintore (died 1715), Scottish nobleman
 John Keith (defensive back) (born 1977), player in the National Football League
 John Keith (linebacker) (born 1986), American football player
 John A. H. Keith (1869–1931), American educator, college football and basketball coach
 John M. Keith, mayor of Missoula, Montana
 John Lucien Keith, British colonial official and civil servant
 J. Andrew Keith (1958–1999), American author and games developer